Lee Jae-sik (born 13 March 1972) is a South Korean speed skater. He competed in three events at the 1994 Winter Olympics.

References

External links
 

1972 births
Living people
South Korean male speed skaters
Olympic speed skaters of South Korea
Speed skaters at the 1994 Winter Olympics
Sportspeople from North Gyeongsang Province